Southwest Georgia is a fourteen-county region in the U.S. state of Georgia. It has a 2010 census population of 496,433, and is the least populated region in Georgia, just slightly behind Southeast Georgia. Additionally, the area has historically been the poorest region of the state since at least 1995, when over 25% of the residents were in poverty.

It is commonly referred to as SOWEGA, pronounced "Sow-WEE-guh".

Southwest Georgia is anchored by Albany, the most populous city and region's sole metropolitan area.

Politics
Southwest Georgia is part of Georgia's 2nd congressional district, which is represented in congress by Sanford Bishop (D) and has a CPVI of D+6. GA-02 has long been a Democratic stronghold, due partly to its large African-American population (it is a majority-minority district). It supported Stacey Abrams for governor in 2018 by a large margin.

Major cities
 Albany- Pop. 77,434
 Thomasville- Pop. 19,398
 Moultrie- Pop. 15,405
 Bainbridge- Pop. 15,697

Metropolitan Areas
 Albany Metropolitan Area- Pop. 157,688

Micropolitan Statistical Areas
 Moultrie Micropolitan Statistical Area- Pop. 45,498
 Thomasville Micropolitan Statistical Area- Pop. 44,720
 Bainbridge Micropolitan Statistical Area- Pop. 29,980

Counties
 Baker Pop. 3,451
 Calhoun Pop. 6,694
 Colquitt Pop. 45,498
 Decatur Pop. 29,980
 Dougherty Pop. 94,565
 Early Pop. 11,008
 Grady Pop. 25,011
 Lee Pop. 28,298
 Miller Pop. 6,125
 Mitchell Pop. 23,498
 Seminole Pop. 8,729
 Terrell Pop. 9,315
 Thomas Pop. 44,720
 Worth Pop. 21,679

Parks and preserves
 Kolomoki Mounds State Historic Park, Early County
 Seminole State Park, Seminole County
The Parks at Chehaw, Dougherty County

References
 Southwest Georgia Regional Commission

Regions of Georgia (U.S. state)